Lavinia Derwent was the pen name of the Scottish author and broadcaster Elizabeth Dodd MBE (1909–1989). She was born in an isolated farmhouse in the Cheviot Hills some seven miles from Jedburgh and began making up stories about animals at an early age. She also wrote a version of Greyfriars Bobby. Her autobiographical books include her Border and Manse series. Border Bairn is set around Jedburgh, while Lady of the Manse has a Berwickshire setting. Derwent's Manse books drew on her experiences keeping house for her Church of Scotland minister brother.

Broadcasting
Derwent's first successes were her Tammy Troot stories, which were read out in the 1920s on Auntie Kathleen's Children's Hour on Scottish Radio. The first of the books was published in 1947. They were still being reprinted in the 1970s, when Derwent, alternating with Molly Weir and Cliff Hanley, co-presented the series Teatime Tales  on the STV (TV network), recalling stories taken from her own childhood.

The Sula books
Derwent books about a fictional island called Sula later featured in BBC's Jackanory, read by John Cairney. These were also made into a television series.

The original novels were: Sula, Return to Sula, The Boy From Sula and Song of Sula.

Bibliography

Tammy Troot (1947)
Tammy Troot's Capers (1947)
 Huffy Puffy the little red engine  (1951)
Macpherson (1961)
Further Adventures of Tammy Troot (1975)
Sula (1969)
Return to Sula (1971)
The Boy from Sula (1973)
Song of Sula (1976)
Macpherson's Island (1970)
Macpherson's Skyscraper (1978)
A Breath of Border Air (1977)
Another Breath of Border Air (1978)
God Bless the Borders (1981)
A Border Bairn (1980)
Beyond the Borders (1989)
The Tale of Greyfriars Bobby (1985)
The Lady of the Manse (1985)
A Mouse in the Manse (1987)

References

1909 births
1989 deaths
People from the Scottish Borders
Scottish children's writers
Scottish television presenters
Scottish women television presenters
Members of the Order of the British Empire
Scottish women writers
Scottish women novelists
British women children's writers
20th-century British women writers
20th-century British novelists